Joseph Gabriel Esther Maneri (February 9, 1927 – August 24, 2009), was an American jazz composer, saxophone and clarinet player. Violinist Mat Maneri is his son.

Boston Microtonal Society
In 1988, Maneri founded the Boston Microtonal Society, dedicated to microtonal music and tuning. It is currently led by James Bergin and Julia Werntz.

Discography
 Kalavinka (Cochlea, 1989)
 Get Ready to Receive Yourself (Leo, 1995)
 Three Men Walking with Mat Maneri, Joe Morris (ECM, 1996)
 Dahabenzapple (hatART, 1996)
 Let the Horse Go (Leo, 1996)
 In Full Cry (ECM, 1997)
 Coming Down the Mountain (hatOLOGY, 1997)
 Paniots Nine (Avant, 1998)
 Blessed with Mat Maneri (ECM, 1998)
 Tales of Rohnlief with Mat Maneri, Barre Phillips (ECM, 1999)
 Tenderly (hatOLOGY, 1999)
 Out Right Now with Mat Maneri and Joe Morris (hatOLOGY, 2001)
 Voices Lowered (Leo, 2001)
 The Trio Concerts (Leo, 2001)
 Going to Church (AUM Fidelity, 2002)
 Angles of Repose (ECM, 2004)
 Peace Concert with Peter Dolger (Atavistic, 2008)
 Pinerskol with Masashi Harada (Leo, 2009)

With Mat Maneri
 Acceptance (hatOLOGY, 1996)
 Pentagon (Thirsty Ear, 2005)

References

External links
 "A Fireside Chat With Joe Maneri" Jazz Weekly
 "Microtonal marks 20 years with several premieres" Boston Globe
 JazzVisionsPhotos.com: Joe Maneri
 Obituary The Guardian

 

1927 births
2009 deaths
20th-century American composers
20th-century American male musicians
20th-century American saxophonists
American classical composers
American jazz clarinetists
American jazz composers
American jazz saxophonists
American male classical composers
American male saxophonists
American people of Italian descent
Avant-garde jazz clarinetists
Avant-garde jazz saxophonists
ECM Records artists
Free improvisation clarinetists
Free improvisation saxophonists
Free jazz clarinetists
American male jazz composers
Microtonal composers
New England Conservatory faculty
20th-century jazz composers